This is a list of notable hotels and inns in Ukraine.

Chernihiv
 Hotel Ukraina
 Hotel Hradecky

Donetsk
 Donbass Palace

Kyiv

 Hotel Ukrayina
 President Hotel
 InterContinental Kyiv
 Opera Hotel
 Hotel Dnipro

Lviv 
 Hotel George
 Grand Hotel

Odessa
 Bristol Hotel
 Londonskaya Hotel
 Odessa Passage

Yalta
 Oreanda Hotel
 Villa Elena Hotel
 Yalta Hotel Complex

Defunct

Pripyat
 Polissya hotel

See also
 Lists of hotels – an index of hotel list articles on Wikipedia

References

 
Ukraine
Hotel